Maiman is a surname. Notable people with the surname include:

Ohad Maiman (born 1977), Israeli photographer
Theodore Harold Maiman (1927–2007), American engineer and physicist
Yossi Maiman (1946−2021), German-born Israeli businessman

See also
Maidman